"Blue Jean" is a song written and recorded by English singer-songwriter David Bowie for his sixteenth studio album Tonight (1984). One of only two tracks on the album to be written entirely by Bowie, it was released as a single ahead of the album and charted in the United States, peaking at No. 8, becoming his 5th and last top 10 hit with no features. The song is loosely inspired by Eddie Cochran.

Following the commercial success of Bowie's previous album, Let's Dance, its singles and the Serious Moonlight Tour, "Blue Jean" was launched with a 21-minute short film, Jazzin' for Blue Jean, directed by Julien Temple. The song performance segment from this was also used as a more conventional music video. The film won the 1985 Grammy Award for "Best Video, Short Form", later renamed "Best Music Video", which proved to be the only competitive Grammy Award Bowie won during his lifetime for over three decades, although Bowie posthumously won four Grammys for his album Blackstar (2016).

"Blue Jean" would remain in Bowie's live repertoire for the rest of his career, being performed on his Glass Spider Tour (1987), Sound+Vision Tour (1990) and A Reality Tour (2004).

Composition and reception 
Interviewed in 1987 and asked to compare a track like "Time Will Crawl" to "Blue Jean," Bowie said "'Blue Jean' is a piece of sexist rock 'n roll. [laughs] It's about picking up birds. It's not very cerebral, that piece." BBC reviewer Chris Jones criticised the song in his appraisal of Best of Bowie in 2002, arguing "'Blue Jean' barely exists, so formulaic is it."  More positively, rock commentator Chris O'Leary, while locating "Blue Jean" firmly "in the pastiche lane," has described the song as "clever" and "catchy" and one of Bowie's "best second-rate hits."

Cash Box said that it "features the dynamics of classic Bowie which range from the smooth and sultry verse to the exploding chorus."

Track listing

7": EMI America / EA 181 (UK) 
 "Blue Jean" – 3:08
 "Dancing with the Big Boys" – 3:32
 Some versions of the 7" single were released on blue vinyl

12": EMI America / 12EA 181 (UK) 
 "Blue Jean" (Extended Dance Mix) – 5:15
 "Dancing with the Big Boys" (Extended Dance Mix) – 7:28
 "Dancing with the Big Boys" (Extended Dub Mix) – 7:15
 "Blue Jean" (Extended Dance Mix) remixed by John "Jellybean" Benitez at Sigma Sound – NYC – Engineer: Jay Mark.
 "Dancing with the Big Boys" remixes produced by Arthur Baker.

Personnel 
 David Bowie – vocals
 Carlos Alomar – guitar
 Carmine Rojas – bass guitar; keyboards
 Omar Hakim – drums
 Lenny Pickett – tenor saxophone; bass clarinet
 Stanley Harrison – alto saxophone
 Steve Elson – baritone saxophone
 Guy St. Onge – marimba
 Curtis King – vocals
 George Simms – vocals
 Robin Clark – vocals
 Sammy Figueroa – percussion

Production
 David Bowie – producer
 Derek Bramble – producer
 Hugh Padgham – producer

Other releases 
 It appears on the following compilations:
 Changesbowie (1990)
 The Singles Collection (1993)
 Best of Bowie (2002)
 The Platinum Collection (2005)
 The Best of David Bowie 1980/1987 (2007)
 Nothing Has Changed (2014) (3-CD and 2-CD editions)
 Bowie Legacy (2016) (2-CD edition)

Video versions 
There are 3 versions of the video:
 The full 21-minute version entitled Jazzin' for Blue Jean. It includes Richard Fairbrass from Right Said Fred on bass guitar, although he didn't play on the record.
 The 3-minute version of the performance of the title track, edited from the full Jazzin' for Blue Jean video. The video is available to download for the Xbox 360 karaoke game Lips.
 An alternate version recorded for MTV in England that has no relation to the other videos. This alternate version was not popularly available until the DVD release of Best of Bowie in 2002.

Chart performance

Certifications

References 
 Pegg, Nicholas, The Complete David Bowie, Reynolds & Hearn Ltd, 2000, 

1984 singles
David Bowie songs
Songs written by David Bowie
Song recordings produced by David Bowie
Song recordings produced by Hugh Padgham
EMI America Records singles
1984 songs